The Oaxacan climbing salamander (Bolitoglossa macrinii) is a species of salamander in the family Plethodontidae.
It is endemic to Mexico.
Its natural habitats are subtropical or tropical moist montane forests and plantations .
It is threatened by habitat loss.

This species lives along the Pacific slope of the Sierra Madre del Sur in Oaxaca, in and around San Miguel Suchixtepec and San Gabriel Mixtepec, and between San Gabriel Mixtepec and Pochutla. It is most often found between 550 and 1,860 meters elevation, and occasionally up to 2,500 meters elevation. Its extent of occurrence (EOO) is 4,756 km2, its area of occupancy (AOO) is 4,345 km2.

References

Bolitoglossa
Endemic amphibians of Mexico
Fauna of the Sierra Madre del Sur
Amphibians described in 1930
Taxonomy articles created by Polbot